Batticaloa Jailbreak may refer to:

1983 Batticaloa Jailbreak, carried out by Tamil militants in September 1983 in Sri Lanka
1984 Batticaloa Jailbreak, carried out by Tamil Tigers in June 1984 in Sri Lanka